Pentila alba is a butterfly in the family Lycaenidae. It is found in the Democratic Republic of the Congo (Haut-Uele, North Kivu, Sankuru and Lualaba), Uganda and north-western Tanzania. The habitat consists of forests.

Adults are on wing in December and January.

References

Butterflies described in 1886
Poritiinae
Butterflies of Africa
Taxa named by Hermann Dewitz